Tavria is primarily a geographic toponym for a subregion of Southern Ukraine that encompasses steppe territories between Dnieper and Molochna rivers and Crimean peninsula. 

Tavria also may refer to:
Tavria Oblast, province of the Russian Empire (1784–96)
Tavria Governorate, governorate of the Russian Empire (1802–1921)
Tavria Okruha, northern part of the Taurida Governorate, which today includes most of the Kherson and southern portion of Zaporizhzhia oblasts (regions)
ZAZ Tavria, Ukrainian car model